The Library Park Historic District is a national historic district located at Ogdensburg in St. Lawrence County, New York. The district includes seven contributing buildings, one contributing site, and one contributing object. They include the Remington Art Museum (1809–10), Ogdensburg Public Library (1810), Library Park, and The Soldiers and Sailors Monument.

It was listed on the National Register of Historic Places in 1982.

References

Queen Anne architecture in New York (state)
Federal architecture in New York (state)
Historic districts in St. Lawrence County, New York
Historic districts on the National Register of Historic Places in New York (state)
National Register of Historic Places in St. Lawrence County, New York